Joseph Carl Bernard (March 24, 1882 – September 22, 1960), nicknamed "J.C.", was an American right-handed pitcher in Major League Baseball who appeared in one game for the St. Louis Cardinals in 1909.

External links

 

1882 births
1960 deaths
Major League Baseball pitchers
St. Louis Cardinals players
Baseball players from Illinois
People from Brighton, Illinois